Rockingham is a historic house that was the home of John Berrien (1711–1772) and George Washington's final headquarters of the Revolutionary War. It is located at 84 Laurel Avenue, Franklin Township in Somerset County, New Jersey. The house was originally located on the hillside east of the Millstone River at Rocky Hill. It has been moved within southern Franklin Township several times, and is now closer to Kingston than to Rocky Hill. The residence is a featured part of the Millstone River Valley Scenic Byway.  The oldest portion of the house was built as a two-room, two-story saltbox style house ; a kitchen and additional rooms were added on in the early 1760s, expanding with the Berrien family.  The first reference to the house as "Rockingham" does not appear until a 1783 newspaper advertisement to sell the house, a name given most likely in honor of the Marquess of Rockingham.

It was added to the National Register of Historic Places on December 18, 1970, for its significance in military and social history. Additional documentation was approved on January 11, 2010, after the house was moved in 2001.

John Berrien
John Berrien was a surveyor and land agent from Long Island whose business brought him into the Millstone River valley in the 1730s.  In 1735, he purchased the small house that overlooked the river.  Berrien eventually became a judge, first in Somerset County before eventually being named to the Supreme Court of New Jersey.  His first wife, Mary Leonard, of Perth Amboy, died in 1758 without bearing children; the next year, he married Margaret Eaton, whose father founded Eatontown, New Jersey.  Together, John and Margaret had six children, four boys (including John Berrien Jr.) and two girls.  John Berrien drowned in the Millstone River in 1772, leaving his estate in the hands of his wife.  He is buried in Princeton Cemetery.

George Washington

General George Washington stayed at Rockingham from August 23, 1783, to November 10, 1783.  He was invited to the area by Congress, who were headquartered in Nassau Hall in Princeton while awaiting the news of the signing of the Treaty of Paris to officially end the Revolutionary War.  Washington was accompanied by three aides-de-camp, a troop of between twelve and twenty-four life guards, his servants and, until early October, his wife Martha Washington.  He spent his time at Rockingham entertaining Congress and other local figures until word of the end of the War reached him on October 31.  On November 2, Washington composed his Farewell Orders to the Armies of the United States at Rockingham, a document dismissing his troops and announcing his retirement from the Army.

House sold
In 1802, Margaret Berrien sold the house to Frederick Cruser, who continued the expansion of the house.  Storage space and servants sleeping quarters were added to the kitchen wing, a second-story balcony added to the front of the house, and the roofline raised to accommodate a third-story attic.  The Cruser family occupied Rockingham until 1841. The house changed hands many times until the 1890s when the property was bought by the Rocky Hill Quarry Company.

Moves

1897 move
The first move of the house was in 1897 to remove it from the Rocky Hill Quarry Company property in Rocky Hill. Kate McFarlane and Josephine Swann helped create the Washington Headquarters Association of Rocky Hill, which raised the money to purchase the structure and move it away from the quarry. In August 1897, the house was opened to the public. In 1935, ownership was turned over to the state of New Jersey.

1956 move
By 1956, the quarry had expanded and the house again was too close to active quarrying. Rockingham was moved a half mile eastward along County Route 518.

2001 move
The house made its final move in 2001. It now sits on a  lot on Kingston-Rocky Hill Road, adjacent to the Delaware and Raritan Canal, on the outskirts of Kingston.  The site reopened to the public in 2004 and is open year-round.

Timeline

Rockingham has been owned by many individuals and moved three times since it was built:
 House built on the hillside east of the Millstone River at Rocky Hill: 
1735 John Berrien buys house and property
1783 George Washington uses Rockingham as headquarters
1802 House sold to Frederick Cruser
1841 House sold to Henry Duryee 
1847 House sold to James Stryker Van Pelt
1869 House sold to David H. Mount
1872 House sold to Martin A. Howell
 House and property sold to Rocky Hill Quarry Company
1897 House moved away from quarry, first move: 
1956 House moved farther away from quarry, second move: 
2001 House moved near Kingston, third move:

Gallery

See also

 List of the oldest buildings in New Jersey
List of Washington's Headquarters during the Revolutionary War

References

External links

 
 Official homepage
 
 

Houses on the National Register of Historic Places in New Jersey
New Jersey Register of Historic Places
Franklin Township, Somerset County, New Jersey
Historic house museums in New Jersey
Museums in Somerset County, New Jersey
Houses in Somerset County, New Jersey
National Register of Historic Places in Somerset County, New Jersey
Relocated buildings and structures in New Jersey
Historic American Buildings Survey in New Jersey
1710 establishments in New Jersey